Charitha Kumarasinghe (born 27 May 1992) is a Sri Lankan cricketer. He made his first-class debut for Moors Sports Club in the 2017–18 Premier League Tournament on 7 January 2018. He made his List A debut for Moors Sports Club in the 2017–18 Premier Limited Overs Tournament on 16 March 2018.

References

External links
 

1992 births
Living people
Sri Lankan cricketers
Bloomfield Cricket and Athletic Club cricketers
Moors Sports Club cricketers
Place of birth missing (living people)